Patrobas Katambi, also known as Paschal Katambi Patrobas, is a Tanzanian politician and Deputy Minister, Prime Minister's Office Labour, Youth and Employment and presently serving as the Chama Cha Mapinduzi's member of parliament for Shinyanga Urban constituency since November 2020.

Career 

He is also a civil servant who was a former Dodoma District Commissioner until 2020, appointed by then President John Magufuli. He was a party Youth Chairman for opposition party in Tanzania CHADEMA and Member of the Central Committee of the National Ethics Committee of the party until 2017.

References 

1984 births
Living people
Tanzanian civil servants
Chama Cha Mapinduzi MPs
Chama Cha Mapinduzi politicians
21st-century Tanzanian politicians
Tanzanian MPs 2020–2025
People from Shinyanga Region
Deputy government ministers of Tanzania
St. Augustine University of Tanzania alumni